Prof. Suayib Yalcin MD (Turkish: Şuayib Yalçın) is an eminent medical oncologist with special interest in cancer treatment and research. He has authored/co-authored more than 80 articles cited in science citation index. His main areas of research interest are gastrointestinal cancers also including neuroendocrine tumors and gastrointestinal stromal tumors as well as supportive care. After graduating from Hacettepe University in Ankara, Turkey in 1989, he became a Medical Oncologist in 1997, and worked as a post doctoral fellow at the Gastrointestinal Oncology Department at the MD Anderson Cancer Center in Houston, Texas. He was appointed as a full professor in 2004, while serving as a faculty at Hacettepe University Cancer Institute, he is also currently the former president of Turkish Society of Medical Oncology and also President of Turkish Association for Cancer Research and Control. He is an active member of ASCO, ESMO, IASGO, MMOF and immediate past national representative of Turkey in ESMO. He has participated in many clinical cancer research projects as a steering committee member, or principal investigator and serves as editorial board of several cancer journals. He currently works at Hacettepe University, Department of Medical Oncology where he continues to contribute to his field.

References

Turkish oncologists
Living people
University of Texas MD Anderson Cancer Center faculty
Year of birth missing (living people)